North Yemen competed as the Yemen Arab Republic at the 1988 Summer Olympics in Seoul, South Korea.  After unification with South Yemen, the nation would return as Yemen at the 1992 Summer Olympics.

Abullah Alizani from the Yemen Arab Republic lost to Israeli Dov Groverman in the first round. Alizani was slated to wrestle the Israeli, but failed to show up for his match even after he was paged three times, in what an Israeli official called a political snub, and Alizani was declared the loser of the Men's Light-Flyweight (48 kg), Greco-Roman match by the referee.

Competitors
The following is the list of number of competitors in the Games.

Athletics

Key
Note–Ranks given for track events are within the athlete's heat only
Q = Qualified for the next round
q = Qualified for the next round as a fastest loser or, in field events, by position without achieving the qualifying target
NR = National record
N/A = Round not applicable for the event
Bye = Athlete not required to compete in round

Men

Judo

North Yemen sent two competitors

Mohamed Kohsrof ended ranked 35th in the men's extra lightweight class

Mohamed Moslih finished ranked 19th in the men's lightweight class

Wrestling

Men's Greco-Roman

Men's Freestyle

References

Official Olympic Reports

Olympics
Nations at the 1988 Summer Olympics
Olympics
1988
Oly